Lubomír Tomeček (born 1979) is a Czech mountain bike orienteer and ski orienteer. He won a bronze medal in the middle distance at the 2007 World MTB Orienteering Championships in  Nove Mesto na Morave, and a bronze medal at the 2008 World MTB Orienteering Championships in Ostróda. With the Czech relay team he won medals at the 2007, 2008 and 2009 World MTB Orienteering Championships.

References

1979 births
Czech orienteers
Male orienteers
Czech male cyclists
Mountain bike orienteers
Living people